The  Hero Pleasure was an automatic scooter manufactured in India by Hero Honda. It was launched in 2005.

History
It was the first scooter manufactured by Hero Honda, traditionally a motorcycle company, and was received very positively. , it sold in the range of 40,000 units per month, and is second only to the Honda Activa in a rapidly growing scooter segment.

The Pleasure was unique at a marketing level more than at a product level. It was positioned sharply as a women's scooter with the brand tagline "Why should boys have all the fun?" conceived by team FCB-Ulka. It thus polarized the entire scooter market, with offerings being positioned either specifically male or female. The Pleasure thus carved a niche for itself, and quickly went on to capture almost 17% of the market in a short space of time. In 2020, the Hero Pleasure was discontinued and was replaced by the Hero Pleasure Plus.

Features
The Pleasure features a  engine with variomatic drive transmission system and an engine swingarm suspension system.

2013 saw a number of improvements in the Pleasure, and included a Pleasure limited edition and the All New Pleasure.

References

External links

 
 Hero Motor Corp Pleasure at Zigwheels.com

Motor scooters
Motorcycles introduced in 2006
Hero Honda motorcycles